The Extendables (also known as Action Hero) is a 2014 American parody film created by and starring Brian Thompson. The film is a parody of The Expendables and similar action movies. Thompson said it contained actual events he had witnessed. The film was released on iTunes.

Plot
The film begins with Brian Thompson's explanation that the movie is his answer to the question: "What's it like to work with Sylvester Stallone, Arnold Schwarzenegger, Steven Seagal or Jean-Claude Van Damme?"  By combining the distinguishable features of these movie stars, he created one fictional character, Vardell Düsseldorfer or VD. VD is an aged and retired action movie star who is now a drug addict and alcoholic. VD plans to return to fame through directing and starring in a science fiction movie called Hard Times on Mars.

As shooting for the film begins, it is clear that VD is out of touch and not performing. VD refuses to alter the poorly-written script, breaks sets, and states that he no longer wants to release the movie. At the peak of the chaos, VD suffers a heart attack.

Following his heart attack, VD's attends the premiere of his movie in Los Angeles, which, as it turns out, is a great success.

Cast
 Brian Thompson as Vardell "VD" Duseldorfer
 Marisa Ramirez as Maria
 Ian Patrick Williams as Sir Jeffrey
 Gary Graham as Burton, a producer
 Michelle Lawrence as Emily
 Lee Garlington as Paint
 Carl Ciarfalio as 1st AD
 Lorielle New as Sue
 Adam J. Smith as Best Boy
 Ron Thomas as Mark, a stunt coordinator
 Mark Dacascos as Mark, a screenwriter
 Sawyer as Soundman
 Leslie Garza Rivera as Salma Hayek
 Tara Gray, Ralek Gracie, Martin Kove, Kevin Sorbo, Bruce Locke, Patrick Warburton and Craig Kilborn make cameo appearances.

References

External links
 
 
 

2014 comedy films
2010s parody films
American parody films
2010s English-language films
2010s American films